The 2017 Moldovan National Division was the 27th season of top-tier football in Moldova. It was played as a double round-robin tournament. This transitional season was a result of the Moldovan Football Federation's decision to change the Divizia Națională season from an Autumn–Spring schedule to a Spring–Autumn one. Sheriff Tiraspol were the defending champions. The competition began on 8 July 2017.

Stadia and locations

Personnel and sponsorship

Managerial changes

League table

Results
The schedule consists of two rounds, each team plays each other once home-and-away for a total of 18 matches per team.

Top goalscorers

Hat-tricks

Top assists

Clean sheets

Attendance

References

External links
 Official website
 uefa.com

National Division 2017
Moldovan Super Liga seasons
Moldova 1